The UCLA Bruins college football team represents University of California, Los Angeles (UCLA) in the Pacific 12 Conference (Pac-12). The Bruins compete as part of the NCAA Division I Football Bowl Subdivision. The program has had 18 head coaches and four interim head coaches since it began play during the 1919 season. Since November 2017, Chip Kelly has served as head coach at UCLA.

Terry Donahue leader in both total wins and seasons coached with 151 wins during his 20 year tenure as head coach of the program. Red Sanders has the highest winning percentage at 0.773. Harry Trotter has the lowest winning percentage of those who have coached more than one game, with 0.156. Of the 18 different head coaches who have led the Edwin C. Horrell, Sanders, Tommy Prothro, and Donahue have been inducted into the College Football Hall of Fame.

Key

Coaches

Notes

References

UCLA

UCLA Bruins football